Mogilica  (German Neuhof) is a village in the administrative district of Gmina Dolice, within Stargard County, West Pomeranian Voivodeship, in north-western Poland.

References

Mogilica